Stade Municipal de Berrechid is a football-specific stadium in Berrechid, Morocco. It is the home stadium of Botola side CA Youssoufia Berrechid. The stadium has a capacity of 5,000.

References 

Football venues in Morocco